Rachel Lynne Tejada (born July 8, 1993) is an American soccer player who last played as a striker for Chicago Red Stars of the National Women's Soccer League (NWSL).

Club career 
Chicago Red Stars drafted Tejada in 2015.

References

External links 
 Illinois State profile
 FBRef profile

Living people
1993 births
People from Troy, Illinois
Women's association football forwards
Illinois State Redbirds women's soccer players
Chicago Red Stars players
National Women's Soccer League players
Soccer players from Illinois
Chicago Red Stars draft picks
American women's soccer players